Teo (also referred to as Teo Macero and the Prestige Jazz Quartet) is an album by saxophonist Teo Macero fronting the Prestige Jazz Quartet, a group nominally led by jazz vibraphonist Teddy Charles, which was recorded in 1957 for the Prestige label.

Reception

The Allmusic review by Scott Yanow stated "The music is advanced but from the jazz tradition, and overall this set is more noteworthy for Macero's interesting playing than for the tunes themselves".

Track listing
 "Ghost Story" (Mal Waldron) - 6:27
 "Please Don't Go Now" (John Ross) - 6:38
 "Just Spring" (Teo Macero) - 4:52
 "Star Eyes" (Gene de Paul, Don Raye) - 7:09
 "Polody" (Teddy Charles) - 5:15
 "What's Not" (Waldron) - 5:52

Personnel 
Teo Macero - tenor saxophone
Teddy Charles - vibraphone
Mal Waldron - piano
Addison Farmer - bass
Jerry Segal - drums

References 

1957 albums
Prestige Records albums
Teo Macero albums
Albums recorded at Van Gelder Studio